John Macallan Swan  (9 December 1846 – 14 February 1910) was an English painter and sculptor.

Biography

Swan was born in Brentford, Middlesex, on 9 December 1846. He received his art training first in England at the Worcester and Lambeth schools of art and the Royal Academy schools, and subsequently in Paris, in the studios of Jean-Léon Gérôme and Emmanuel Frémiet. He began to exhibit at the Academy in 1878. His picture The Prodigal Son, bought for the Chantrey collection in 1889 (and now in the Tate Britain), established his reputation as an artist. He married artist Mary Rankin Swan in Ireland in 1884 and had two children with her, including sculptor Mary Alice Swan.

He was elected associate in the Royal Academy in 1894 and academician in 1905. He was appointed a member of the Dutch Water-Colour Society in 1885; and associate of the Royal Society of Painters in Water Colours in 1896 and full member in 1899. He was awarded first class gold medals for painting and sculpture in the Paris Exhibition, 1900.

Work

A master of the oil, water-colour and pastel mediums, an accomplished painter and a skilful draughtsman, he ranks also as a sculptor of distinguished ability, having worked in nearly every material.  He has treated the human figure with notable power, but it is by his representations of the larger wild animals, mainly the felidae, that he chiefly established his reputation; in this branch of practice he has scarcely a rival.

Painting
His subjects in oil include animals, figures, and landscapes, and are distinguished by massive, simple treatment, and a strongly imaginative element. Noted examples include:
Ocelot and Fish
Tigers
Tigers Drinking
Ceylon Leopards
Lions
Lioness Defending Her Cubs
Polar Bear Swimming

Sculpture

The modeling in his sculptured works is broad, flexible, and naturalistic. Here he has been compared with Antoine-Louis Barye. Noted examples include:
The Jaguar
Puma and Macaw
Wounded Leopard
Leopard Running
 The eight bronze lions and bust of Cecil Rhodes at Rhodes Memorial in Cape Town, South Africa

Notes

References

Attribution
  This work in turn cites:
A. L. Baldry, "The Work of J. M. Swan" in The Studio, vol. xxii.
Drawings of John M. Swan, R.A. (George Newnes, Ltd.)

External links

 

The Prodigal Son (Tate collections)
Profile on Royal Academy of Arts Collections
Boy Piping to the Fishes
Buried at St John's Churchyard, Niton, Isle of Wight

1846 births
1910 deaths
People from Brentford
English sculptors
English male sculptors
19th-century English painters
English male painters
20th-century English painters
English watercolourists
20th-century British sculptors
19th-century British sculptors
Royal Academicians
20th-century English male artists
19th-century English male artists